California Proposition 14 may refer to three different and unrelated propositions proposed in California:

California Proposition 14 (1964), concerning housing discrimination
California Proposition 14 (2010), concerning the election system
California Proposition 14 (2020), concerning biomedical research into embryonic stem cells